Lee Elijah (born February 19, 1990) is a South Korean actress. She debuted with leading role in 2013 tvN's drama Basketball. After several years in major supporting roles, she was cast as lead again with JTBC's The Good Detective (2020).

Early life
Lee Elijah was born into a Protestant family. Her parents named her after the prophet Elijah in the Old Testament. Lee learned horse riding, taekwondo, ballet, vocal music when she was a child. She studied acting from Seoul Institute of the Arts.

Career
Lee Elijah debuted as the female lead in 2013 period sport series, Basketball.

After her debut, for few years she did major supporting roles in diverse genres. Some of her notable performances came in 2018-2019 such as: legal drama Ms. Hammurabi, modern monarchy The Last Empress, and political thriller Chief of Staff.

Lee made her film debut with a starring role for 2019 romantic comedy .

In 2020, Lee returned to lead role in series with crime procedural The Good Detective.

On November 15, 2021, it was announced that Lee's contract with King Kong by Starship has ended.

In March 2022, Lee signed with new agency Ungbin ENS.

Filmography

Film

Television series

Television  show

Music video

Awards and nominations

References

External links

1990 births
Living people
People from South Gyeongsang Province
21st-century South Korean actresses
South Korean television actresses
Seoul Institute of the Arts alumni